Eichstedt (Altm) is a railway station in the town of Eichstedt, Saxony-Anhalt, Germany. The station lies on the Magdeburg-Wittenberge railway and the train services are operated by Deutsche Bahn.

Train services

The station is served by the following services:

References

External links
Deutsche Bahn website

Railway stations in Saxony-Anhalt